The 1995 All-Ireland Senior Ladies' Football Championship Final was the 22nd All-Ireland Final and the deciding match of the 1995 All-Ireland Senior Ladies' Football Championship, an inter-county ladies' Gaelic football tournament for the top teams in Ireland.

Waterford defeated Monaghan for the second year in a row.

References

!
All-Ireland Senior Ladies' Football Championship Finals
Waterford county ladies' football team matches
Monaghan county ladies' football team matches